The Railroad Valley springfish Crenichthys nevadae, is a rare goodeid fish of the Great Basin of western United States, occurring naturally in just seven thermal springs of Railroad Valley in Nye County, Nevada.

The body gives a somewhat heavy or massive impression, particularly forward, the head being almost as wide as deep.  Each side has a distinctive row of dark blotches, with pale bars in between.  The pelvic fins are entirely absent, while the anal fin is large, with 13 rays.  The dorsal fin is set far back on the body, just above the anal fin, and is somewhat smaller than the anal fin, with 12 rays.

This springfish is omnivorous, with animal food representing 2/3 or more of its consumption during the summer, primarily consisting of gastropods.  Plant consumption is mostly filamentous algae.  While intestine length is consistent with an omnivore, Sigler & Sigler suggest that the high water temperatures of the springfish habitat may demand the higher energy available with animal food.

The warm springs in which these are found range in temperature from 77 to 102 degrees F (25 to 39 C).

Although the Railroad Valley springfish is not currently threatened with extinction, its extremely limited range makes it vulnerable to competition from introduced species, and to habitat modifications.  For instance, it was nearly eliminated from Duckwater Spring in the early 1980s by introduced channel catfish.  The springfish has been introduced to Chimney Springs and in Hot Creek Canyon in Nye County, Nevada.

References

 
 
 FWS page for Railroad Valley springfish
 FWS life history page

Railroad Valley springfish
Endemic fauna of Nevada
Freshwater fish of the United States
ESA threatened species
Fish described in 1932
Taxa named by Carl Leavitt Hubbs